Scutia myrtina is a species of plant in the family Rhamnaceae.  It is commonly known as cat-thorn.

Description
Scutia myrtina is a variable plant that may grow as a shrub or tree of 2-10 m tall with trunk diameter to 30 cm or often a scandent liane, climbing by means of thorns. Older bark is dark, corky and longitudinally fissured. Younger growth is hairy and branchlets green and angular. The thorns are sharp, recurved and paired at the nodes, but sometimes absent. The common name, cat-thorn, refers to the thorns that look like a cat's claw.

Leaves are ovate to obovate in shape, often notched at the apex, but always with mucronulate tip, opposite with usually entire margin, sometimes wavy.

The fruit is a berry with black skin and white flesh containing two to three seeds.

Distribution
The plant is found in Asia and Africa.

Conservation
Scutia myrtina has not been assessed for the IUCN Red List (as at 2018-05-07), but is listed as least concern in the Red List of South African Plants.

Uses
Several species in the genus Scutia have been used in traditional medicine, such as the Ayurvedic system from India.

References

Rhamnaceae
Taxa named by Nicolaas Laurens Burman